Haderner Stern is an U-Bahn station in Munich on the U6. It serves the nearby shopping centre and student accommodation.

References

External links

Munich U-Bahn stations
Railway stations in Germany opened in 1993
Infrastructure completed in 1993